Poncione may refer to the following mountains in the Lepontine Alps in Switzerland:

Poncione dei Laghetti
Poncione dei Laghetti (Lavertezzo)
Poncione di Braga
Poncione di Piotta
Poncione di Valleggia
Poncione di Vespero
Poncione Piancascia
Poncione Pro do Rodùc
Poncione Rosso